The 1925 All-Southwest Conference football team consists of American football players chosen by various organizations for All-Southwest Conference teams for the 1925 college football season.

All Southwest selections

Quarterbacks
 Herman Clark, TCU (AP-1, JH, JT)
 Bob Berry, Texas A&M (AP-2)

Halfbacks
 Mack Saxon, Texas (AP-1, JH, JT)
 Joel Hunt, Texas A&M (AP-1, JT)
 Chris Cortemeglia, SMU (JH)
 Edward W. Herting Jr., Rice (AP-2)
 Jones, Baylor (AP-2)

Fullbacks
 Mule Wilson, Texas A&M (AP-1, JH, JT)
 King, Texas (AP-2)

Ends
 Earl Key, SMU (AP-1, JH, JT)
 Matthew Newell, Texas (AP-1, JH)
 Rags Matthews, TCU (AP-2, JT)
 Curtis Parker, Arkansas (AP-2)

Tackles
 Harold "Tubby" Brewster, TCU (AP-1, JH, JT)
 L.G. Dieterich, Texas A&M (AP-1, JH, JT)
 Clem "Ox" Higgins, Texas (AP-2)
 Watters, SMU (AP-2)

Guards
 Brockman, Oklahoma (JH)
 W.M. Dansby, Texas A&M (AP-1, JH, JT)
 Walker, Baylor (AP-2, JT)
 Vaughn, SMU (AP-2)

Centers
 John Underwood, Rice (AP-1 [g], JH, JT)
 H. C. Pfannkuche, Texas (AP-1)
 Johnny Washmon, TCU (AP-2)

Key
 AP = Associated Press, based on selections by sports writers, Southwest Conference coaches, and numerous officials
 JH = John Heisman, head coach at Rice
 JT = Jinx Tucker

See also
 1925 College Football All-America Team

References

All-Southwest Conference
All-Southwest Conference football teams